Ingrid Kavelaars (born March 20, 1971) is a Canadian actress known for her role on the science-fiction series Code Name: Eternity.

Early life
Kavelaars was born in London, Ontario, Canada. Her parents are Dutch. Her mother, Anne, was a homemaker and her father, John, was a farmer. Kavelaars and her twin Monique are the youngest of five children. Kavelaars at 15 was named Miss Teen London (Ontario) in 1987, and that year was first runner-up for Miss Teen Canada.

She moved to New York City at 18 to study at The American Musical and Dramatic Academy. Following theater work in New York, she relocated first to Toronto, where she appeared in commercials, and then Vancouver, British Columbia, where she began work in series television.

Career
Kavelaars appeared in three episodes of the Canadian/American science-fiction series Stargate SG-1 in 2003 and 2004, playing U.S. Air Force Major Erin Gant. That series and the single-season science-fiction Code Name: Eternity, which she starred as psychotherapist Dr. Laura Keating, ran in the U.S. on Syfy. In 2006, she was a main character in the two-season Canadian television series Whistler. In 2010, Kavelaars began playing Lori Unger in the HBO Canada series Living in Your Car.

She also played presidential candidate Harriet Traymore in season two of XIII: The Series.

Personal life
Kavelaars married professional hockey player Dallas Eakins.

Selected filmography

References

External links

1971 births
Actresses from London, Ontario
Canadian people of Dutch descent
Canadian film actresses
Canadian television actresses
Living people
Canadian twins
20th-century Canadian actresses
21st-century Canadian actresses
Canadian beauty pageant contestants
American Musical and Dramatic Academy alumni